The Australian cricket team in England in 1909 played 42 first-class matches, including five Test matches to contest The Ashes. Australia was captained by Monty Noble, England by Archie MacLaren. The third Test of the series, at Headingley, was the 100th Test match to be played by England.

Test series summary
Australia won the Test series 2–1, with two matches drawn.

First Test

Second Test

Third Test

Fourth Test

Fifth Test

References

Further reading
 Wisden Cricketers' Almanack 1910
 Bill Frindall, The Wisden Book of Test Cricket 1877-1978, Wisden, 1979
 Chris Harte, A History of Australian Cricket, Andre Deutsch, 1993
 Ray Robinson, On Top Down Under, Cassell, 1975

External links
 CricketArchive – tour summaries
 

1909 in Australian cricket
1909 in English cricket
International cricket competitions from 1888–89 to 1918
1909
English cricket seasons in the 20th century
1909